Davoud Hermidas-Bavand (born 1934 in Tehran) is an Iranian former career diplomat and  political scientist. He is currently a member of National Front of Iran's leadership council and serves as its spokesperson.

Hermidas-Bavand served in Iran's delegation to the United Nations. He was Vice-Chairman of the ad hoc committee on the drafting of International Convention against the Taking of Hostages in 1979.

Education 
Bavand obtained with honors a bachelor's degree in law and political sciences from Tehran University in 1957. He left Iran in 1958 and he was conferred a doctorate in international relations by American University, Washington, D.C., in 1963.

Teaching 
Bavand has taught at Rhode Island University, Allameh Tabatabai University (International Law and International Relations), Tehran, Imam Sadegh University and Azad University.

Among his famous students during his teaching, we can mention Ali Latifiyan.

Aseman newspaper case
Aseman (Sky), a reformist newspaper was shut because of an interview with Bavand after just one week of publication. The closure was done after Davoud Hermidas-Bavand described eye-for-an-eye punishment as "inhumane."
Aseman was aligned with the country’s new president Hassan Rouhani. Former reformist president, Mohammad Khatami, had endorsed the paper in a letter published in its first edition, saying, “Whenever the space for life tightens; whenever the land dries up and is deprived of water,” people “lift their eyes to the sky to keep hope alive.”

According to the Prosecutor's office, "The newspaper was banned for spreading lies and insulting Islam."

Books
"Historical, Legal and Political Sovereignty Over Abu Musa, the Greater and Lesser Tunbs"
"Landlocked and Semi-Landlocked Seas"
"Macro Policies and Micro Islands"
"Norouz, Violation of International Commitments and Consequent Responsibilities."

Notes

Iranian political scientists
People from Tehran
University of Tehran alumni
1934 births
Living people
National Front (Iran) politicians
People from Savadkuh
Iranian diplomats
Members of the National Council for Peace